Benja Apan (born 1999) is a Thai student and activist. She is one of the leaders of the United Front of Thammasat and Demonstration (UFTD) group that agitated for revolutionary reforms to the monarchy on 10 August 2020. She became a prominent UFTD leader later in 2021. In the 2020–2021 Thai protests, she co-organized the German embassy in Bangkok protest in 2020 to pressure the King that resided in Germany, drawing more than 10,000 protesters. In August 2021, she led UFTD 'Car Mob' protest. She was arrested by Thong Lor police for lèse majesté following her reforms to the monarchy speech in front of Sino-Thai tower. She had been imprisoned await trial for 100 days in Central Women Correctional Institution from 7 October 2021 to 14 January 2022, and she was sentenced to 6 months in prison on contempt of court along the way.

Activism (2020–2021)
Benja Apan entered Sirindhorn International Institute of Technology within Thammasat University to study engineering. where she joined the United Front of Thammasat and Demonstration group that enacted revolutionary reforms to the monarchy movement with Panusaya Sithijirawattanakul and Parit since 10 August 2020.

On 26 October 2020, while Arnon Nampa co-leader of the Rasadon group was detained, Benja became one of the leaders in the protest at the Germany embassy in Bangkok to put pressure on King Maha Vajiralongkorn who resided in Germany. It drew more than 10,000 protesters according to Nikkei Asia. Three days later Thung Mahamek police charged her with sedition along with Patsaravalee Tanakitvibulpon, Korakot Saengyenphan, Chanin Wongsri, Cholathit Chote-sawat.

Benja gave out a speech for the first time on 7th of November about sexism in the science industry.

On 19 January 2021, she went to Iconsiam shopping mall, which was owned by Sirindhorn and Charoen Pokphand group, to protest by holding signs saying "Monopolizing the vaccine to give the spotlight to the monarchy", directly linked to Vajiralongkorn's Siam Bioscience drug company. She was harassed and assaulted by Iconsiam guard. As a result, this protest gained a lot of interest from Thai media.

On 29th of April, Benja and a group of other students came to the Criminal Court to send an open letter demanding the release of imprisoned activists such as Parit Chiwarak, signed by over 10,000 supporters. She called Chanathip Muanpawong, the judge who denied bail, to come to receive the letter. She scattered sheets of paper printed with the names of 11,035 supporters on the stairs to the court building. She said that the students are not a threat to national security, but wanting to improve Thai society and for the monarchy to exist under the law.

Benja led the 10 August 2021 UFTD 'Car Mob' protest which started at Ratchaprasong intersection. She stated in front of the Sino-Thai office, a construction company owned by Deputy Prime Minister Anutin Charnvirakul, that the 2014 coup by Prime Minister Prayut Chan-o-cha benefited only the elite. She criticized the government’s mishandling of COVID-19 pandemic in Thailand, rebooting the economy, revocation of the junta constitution, reforms in state structures, and, lastly, the monarchy.

Imprisonment (2021–2022)
Benja was arrested on 7 October and was charged with lèse majesté related to the 10 August 2021 'Car Mob' protest, demanding political and monarchy reform. She has been denied bail and imprisoned while she awaited trial at Central Women Correctional Institution. On 4 November, she was sentenced to 6 months in prison on contempt of court on 29 April 2021, demanding the release of imprisoned activists. According to her lawyer, she was faced with a maximum jail term.

After 100 days of an arbitrary detention, on 14th of January 2022, Benja received all bails for the temporary release. The bails costed her total of 200,000 baht, paid by the Ratsadornprasong fund. She was ordered to wear an electronic monitoring device, to stay home from 6 pm to 6 am, and was banned from travelling abroad without the court’s permission.

See also 
 2020–2021 Thai protests
 Human rights in Thailand
 Lèse-majesté in Thailand
 Panusaya Sithijirawattanakul

References 

Apan Benja
Apan Benja
People accused of lèse majesté in Thailand
People accused of lèse majesté in Thailand since 2020
People from Nakhon Ratchasima province
Apan Benja
Thai activists
Thai democracy activists
Thai human rights activists
Thai monarchy reform activists
Thai political prisoners
Thai revolutionaries